Lincoln Financial Field, commonly known as The Linc, is an American football stadium in Philadelphia, Pennsylvania. It serves as the home stadium of the Philadelphia Eagles of the National Football League (NFL) and the Temple Owls football team of Temple University. It is located in South Philadelphia on Pattison Avenue between 11th and South Darien streets alongside I-95. It is part of the South Philadelphia Sports Complex and has a seating capacity of 71,896.

The stadium opened on August 3, 2003 after two years of construction that began on May 7, 2001, replacing Veterans Stadium, which opened in 1971 and served as the home field for both the Eagles and Philadelphia Phillies until 2003 and 2004, respectively. While total seating capacity is similar to that of Veterans Stadium, the new stadium includes double the number of luxury and wheelchair-accessible seats and more modern services.

Naming rights were sold in June 2002 to the Lincoln Financial Group, for a sum of $139.6 million over 21 years. The City of Philadelphia and the Commonwealth of Pennsylvania cumulatively contributed approximately $188 million in public funding to the stadium construction. Additional construction funding was raised from the sale of stadium builder's licenses, which are necessary to purchase season tickets for some of the stadium's best seating levels.

The Army–Navy football game is frequently played at the stadium due to Philadelphia being located halfway between both service academies, the stadium being able to house the large crowds in attendance, and the historic nature of the city. Temple University's Division I college football team also plays their home games at Lincoln Financial Field, paying the Eagles $3 million a year to do so as of February 2020. The Philadelphia Union of Major League Soccer have played exhibition games here against high-profile international clubs when their stadium Subaru Park does not provide adequate seating. The stadium also plays host to several soccer games each year and will host matches during the 2026 FIFA World Cup. It has also played host to the NCAA lacrosse national championship four times, in 2005, 2006, 2013, and 2019 respectively.

Features 
The design of the stadium is meant to evoke the team's namesake eagle with wing like canopies above the east and west stands and the Eagle's Nest balcony beyond the north end-zone. The team's primary eagle logo is patterned in the dark green seats of the upper deck of the east and west stands. Three open corners of the stadium provide fans with views of the Philadelphia skyline and the field. The exterior of the stadium uses a brick façade to reference the historic brick architecture present throughout Philadelphia, while the exposed steel structure evokes the city's bridges and future.

In late spring 2013, the Eagles announced that there would be some major upgrades to Lincoln Financial Field over the next two years. The total project estimate was valued at over $125 million. The upgrades included seating expansion, two new HD video boards, upgraded amenities, WiFi, and two new connecting bridges for upper levels. These upgrades were decided upon after research from season ticket holders, advisory boards, and fan focus groups. The majority of these changes, including WiFi (which would accommodate 45,000 users and have coverage over the entire stadium), were completed by the 2013 home opener. The upgraded sound systems and video boards were finished for the 2014 season.

Suites and lounges 

There are 172 Luxury Suites at Lincoln Financial Field. They range in capacity from 12 to 40 people and cost $75,000 to $300,000 per year or $20,000 for a single game rental. The suites are located in six separate areas throughout the stadium. There are 3,040 luxury suite seats in total.

There are two exclusive  club lounges in the stadium. The lounge on the west side is the "Hyundai Club" and the one on the east side is the "Tork Club". Suite holders and club seat holders have access to these 2 lounges. There are a total of 10,828 club seats in the stadium. These club seats feature some unique benefits above and beyond the lounges. One major benefit is the lounges open hours before the event, in most cases 2–4 hours. The lounges also have multiple full-service bars in them. The seats in the club level are padded, and there is also a wait staff present to serve food and drinks.

Parking 
There are numerous parking lots surrounding Lincoln Financial Field. The parking assignments may change depending on other activities in the area on a particular day. According to the stadium's website, all lots cost visitors $45 and $90 for an oversized vehicle. Tailgating is allowed in all lots except for T-X lots. The majority of the lots are public cash lots.

Notable events 

 August 3, 2003: Lincoln Financial Field hosted its first ticketed event, a soccer match between Manchester United and FC Barcelona
 August 22, 2003: The Philadelphia Eagles hosted the New England Patriots in the first pre-season football game at Lincoln Financial Field with the Patriots defeating the Philadelphia Eagles 24–12
 September 6, 2003: Lincoln Financial Field hosted its first regular-season college football game, a college matchup of local Philadelphia rivals, Villanova and Temple. Villanova prevailed 23–20 in double overtime.
 September 8, 2003: The Eagles and the Tampa Bay Buccaneers competed on Monday Night Football in the first regular-season NFL game at Lincoln Financial Field. The game was referenced as the "Inaugural Game" at Lincoln Financial Field. The defending champion Buccaneers shut out the Eagles 17–0 in their new home.
 January 11, 2004: NFL Divisional Playoff game (Philadelphia Eagles 20, Green Bay Packers 17). This game is also known as "The Miracle of 4th and 26". Donovan McNabb connected on a 28-yard pass to receiver Freddie Mitchell on 4th and 26 late in the 4th quarter with the Eagles out of timeouts. This led to the game-tying field goal that sent the game into overtime. In the overtime period, Brett Favre tossed an interception to Brian Dawkins, which set up David Akers' game-deciding 37-yard field goal that sent the Eagles to their third straight NFC Championship Game.
 January 18, 2004: NFC Championship Game (Carolina Panthers 14, Philadelphia Eagles 3). Eagles lose their third straight NFC Championship Game.
 May 2004: Minor modifications were made to the stadium to change capacity slightly. Some seats were removed from the club box level to increase handicap access. The temporary seats were removed in the north east end zone and a permanent structure was erected and formally named The Pepsi Zone.  It is designed as a family-friendly section.
 January 16, 2005: NFC Divisional Playoff Game (Philadelphia Eagles 27, Minnesota Vikings 14). Eagles advance to their fourth consecutive NFC Championship Game.
 January 23, 2005: NFC Championship Game (Philadelphia Eagles 27, Atlanta Falcons 10). Eagles advance to the Super Bowl for the first time since 1980.
 January 7, 2007: NFC Wild Card Playoff Game (Philadelphia Eagles 23, New York Giants 20). David Akers wins the game with a field goal as time expires.
 September 23, 2007: Wearing 1933 throwback uniforms celebrating the team's 75th anniversary, the Eagles set multiple team records in a 56–21 victory over the Detroit Lions, the second most points in team history. It was the first time the Eagles ever had a 300-yard passer (Donovan McNabb), a 200-yard receiver (Kevin Curtis), and a 100-yard rusher (Brian Westbrook) in the same game.
 April 10, 2010: The Philadelphia Union win their inaugural home opener, a 3–2 victory over D.C. United. A second match was played against FC Dallas on May 15; those games served as home games before the opening of Subaru Park June 27 against Seattle Sounders FC.
 May 29, 2010: US men's national soccer team won their match 2–1 against Turkey in the last game of the 2010 World Cup Send Off Series. A crowd of 55,407 people attended, setting at the time a new attendance record for U.S Soccer at Lincoln Financial Field.
 July 21, 2010: Philadelphia Union hosted Manchester United on their North America tour. Manchester United won, 1–0.
 September 12, 2010: The Eagles honored the 50th Anniversary of their last NFL Championship, wearing replicas of the  uniforms in a 27–20 loss to the Green Bay Packers.
 January 9, 2011: NFC Wild Card Playoff (Green Bay Packers 21, Philadelphia Eagles 16). Michael Vick throws a game-ending interception.
 December 8, 2013: The Eagles erased a 14-point deficit to score 20 unanswered points in the fourth quarter en route to a 34–20 victory over the Detroit Lions amidst a driving snowstorm that lasted throughout the game. This game is referred to as the "Snow Bowl". 
 January 4, 2014: NFC Wild Card Playoff (New Orleans Saints 26, Philadelphia Eagles 24). Shayne Graham kicks the game-winning field goal at the end of the game.
 July 26, 2015: In the 2015 CONCACAF Gold Cup final, Mexico defeated Jamaica 3–1 in a nearly sold-out game with 68,930 in attendance.
 October 31, 2015: Temple hosts Notre Dame on ESPN Saturday Night Football on ABC in primetime in front of a sold-out record crowd of 69,280. Notre Dame defeated Temple 24–20.
 January 13, 2018: NFC Divisional Playoff (Philadelphia Eagles 15, Atlanta Falcons 10). The Eagles stopped the Falcons on 4th and goal in the final minute to preserve the victory.
 January 21, 2018: NFC Championship Game (Philadelphia Eagles 38, Minnesota Vikings 7). Eagles advance to the Super Bowl for the first time in thirteen years.
 September 6, 2018: NFL Kickoff Game (Philadelphia Eagles 18, Atlanta Falcons 12). The Super Bowl Champion Philadelphia Eagles defeated the Atlanta Falcons in a rematch of their 2017 NFC Divisional Playoff matchup.
 February 23, 2019: In the 2019 NHL Stadium Series, the Philadelphia Flyers defeated the Pittsburgh Penguins 4–3 in overtime, in front of a crowd of 69,620, the largest recorded attendance for a hockey game in Pennsylvania.
November 20, 2019: The Linc hosted a high school football game between the Pleasantville Greyhounds and Camden Panthers in a resumption of a game that was interrupted on November 15 due to a shooting that left one dead.
 January 5, 2020: NFC Wild Card Playoff (Seattle Seahawks 17, Philadelphia Eagles 9). Russell Wilson leads the Seahawks past the Eagles after Carson Wentz left with a head injury following a controversial helmet-to-helmet hit from Jadeveon Clowney.
 January 21, 2023 NFC Divisional Playoff (Philadelphia Eagles 38, New York Giants 7). The Eagles complete a 3-game sweep of the Giants for the 2022 season en route to the NFC Championship Game.
 January 29, 2023: NFC Championship Game (Philadelphia Eagles 31, San Francisco 49ers 7). The Eagles won in dominant fashion against the 49ers to advance to Super Bowl LVII.

Controversies 
 For the inaugural season at Lincoln Financial Field (2003), the Eagles imposed a ban on hoagies and cheesesteaks being brought into the stadium, citing security concerns related to the events of September 11. The ban only lasted one week after much mockery by fans and sports radio, along with traditional media.
 Prior to the first Eagles game of the 2007 season, a ruling was made concerning a Philadelphia and national tradition: tailgating. While the Eagles did not ban the act entirely, they did ban the use of tables and tents as well as the purchasing of more than one parking spot per vehicle. Prices were also doubled to $40 for RVs and buses, and $20 for cars. Fans have been reported to be upset.

Training camp 
The Eagles decided after the 2012 season to move training camp from Lehigh University in Bethlehem to Philadelphia. As a part of this new agreement,  the Eagles will have multiple practices, which are open to the public, at Lincoln Financial Field. The rest of the practices will be closed, and will take place across the street at the NovaCare Complex.

College football 

Lincoln Financial Field is the home field for Temple University football. On August 13, 2003, the Philadelphia Eagles and Temple University announced a 15-year agreement for Temple to play their home football games at Lincoln Financial Field. Temple played its first game at the Linc on September 6, 2003 against Villanova, the teams' first meeting since 1980.  During the 2015 season, the Temple Owls sold out the Linc on two occasions.  The September 5 season opener against Penn State, and again on October 31 in a prime time matchup against Notre Dame. With its capacity of 69,796, it is the largest stadium in the American Athletic Conference.

Lincoln Financial Field is the primary home to the Army–Navy Game. The game has been played the most often in Philadelphia. It was played at Veterans Stadium for the final time in 2001, and prior to the Vet, at John F. Kennedy Stadium and Franklin Field. The Linc hosted the game five times between 2003 and 2009. It was announced on June 9, 2009 that the game would be played in Philadelphia at the Linc in 2010, 2012, 2013, 2015 and 2017.

Lincoln Financial Field is one of only five stadiums to be the home of both an NFL and college team; the other four are Allegiant Stadium in Las Vegas (Raiders and UNLV), Hard Rock Stadium in Miami (Dolphins and Hurricanes), Acrisure Stadium in Pittsburgh (Steelers and Panthers), and Raymond James Stadium in Tampa (Buccaneers and South Florida).

Attendance Records

Soccer 
 
The stadium opened on August 3, 2003 with 68,396 attending a preseason friendly with Manchester United defeating Barcelona 3–1. It hosted some 2003 FIFA Women's World Cup matches.

In 2004, after winning the gold-medal in soccer at the 2004 Summer Olympics, the U.S. women's team conducted a "Fan Celebration Tour", playing ten matches across the United States from September to December 2004. The matches were the final national team appearances for Mia Hamm, Joy Fawcett, and Julie Foudy, all of whom retired after the tour. The team played at the Linc on November 6, 2004 where they lost 3–1 to Denmark in front of 14,812 spectators.

In late July and early August 2004, Manchester United returned to play Celtic and A.C. Milan played Chelsea in two friendly matches.

On July 18, 2009, Lincoln Financial Field hosted a doubleheader quarterfinal for the 2009 CONCACAF Gold Cup. The first game was between Canada and Honduras, and the second between USA and Panama. This was the first full international appearance for the United States national soccer team in Philadelphia since a 1968 friendly against Israel at Temple Stadium.

Lincoln Financial Field was listed by U.S. Soccer's World Cup bid committee as one of 18 stadiums to be potential sites for the United States to host the 2022 FIFA World Cup.

The Linc was also the first home of the Philadelphia Union early in 2010. The Union played their home opener against D.C. United at the Linc on April 10, 2010 due to construction delays at their new stadium, PPL Park (now Subaru Park). The Union defeated United, 3–2. The Union also played FC Dallas to a 1–1 tie in the second home game in franchise history at the Linc. After moving to their permanent venue in Chester, the Philadelphia Union continued to use the Linc for matches where ticket demand is expected to far exceed the full capacity at its regular home until 2011. English powerhouse club Manchester United met the Philadelphia Union during their pre-season tour on July 21, 2010, with Manchester defeating the Union by a score of 1–0. The Union played the Spanish powerhouse club Real Madrid on July 24, 2011, with Real Madrid prevailing, 2–1.

Lincoln Financial Field also hosted the US National team's final match on home soil before the 2010 World Cup. The US defeated Turkey 2–1 on May 29, 2010.

The US men's national team returned to Lincoln Financial Field on August 10, 2011, for an international friendly match against Mexico, where they tied 1-1.

In 2012, the stadium hosted a World Football Challenge match between Real Madrid and Celtic F.C. with Real Madrid winning 2–0.

On August 2, 2014, Lincoln Financial Field hosted a soccer match between A.S. Roma and Inter Milan which was part of the 2014 International Champions Cup. Inter Milan won the match 2–0.

On July 26, 2015, the Linc hosted the final match of the 2015 CONCACAF Gold Cup.

In 2016, the stadium hosted games in the Copa América Centenario.

The Linc hosted a doubleheader of quarterfinals of the 2017 CONCACAF Gold Cup and did so again for the 2019 CONCACAF Gold Cup.

On July 25, 2018, the Linc hosted a 2018 International Champions Cup match between Juventus F.C. and FC Bayern Munich that Juventus won 2–0.

On August 29, 2019, the Linc hosted the US Women's National Team in the second match of their victory tour in a game against Portugal. The match set the record for the highest attendance for the team in a friendly match, attracting 49,504 fans. The United States won 4–0.

2026 FIFA World Cup

Lincoln Financial Field will host matches during the 2026 FIFA World Cup, making it one of the eleven selected U.S. venues. During the event, the stadium will be temporarily renamed to "Philadelphia Stadium" in accordance with FIFA's policy on corporate sponsored names.

Other sports 

The NCAA Division I Men's Lacrosse Championship in 2005, 2006, 2013, 2015, 2016, 2019 and 2020 were held at the stadium.

The Philadelphia Phillies celebrated their 2008 World Series championship with a parade down Broad Street, appearance before a sold-out crowd at the Linc, and then a ceremony at Citizens Bank Park. The Citizens Bank Park ceremony was simulcast to the crowd at the Linc. Tickets to the event at Lincoln Financial Field were made available at no cost to the public and were gone within 45 minutes when they were made available at 3pm on October 30, 2008.

Monster Jam performed at the stadium from 2010 to 2012 as part of the summer stadium tour. After a six-year absence, Monster Jam returned to the stadium on May 5, 2018. Previous events took place during the winter at the Spectrum and the Wells Fargo Center from 2013 to 2015.

On February 23, 2019, the Philadelphia Flyers defeated the Pittsburgh Penguins 4–3 in overtime in the 2019 NHL Stadium Series in front of a crowd of 69,620, the largest record attendance for a hockey game in Pennsylvania.

On July 27, 2022, it was announced that Lincoln Financial Field would host WrestleMania XL, on April 6, and April 7, 2024.

Entertainment

Concerts

In TV and Movies 
The stadium is prominently featured in the opening of the TV show It's Always Sunny in Philadelphia. It also features in the third episode of season 3 of the show.
The stadium also appeared in the 2012 movie, Silver Linings Playbook.

Awards 
In 2013, Lincoln Financial Field was considered one of the "greenest" NFL stadiums.  Energy-efficient additions include 11,000 solar panels, and 14 UGE-4K wind turbines outside and on top of the stadium respectively. These installations account for 30% of the electricity used to run the facility. 2013 also marked the fourth year in a row that the venue made the top of PETA's list of "Vegetarian-Friendly NFL Stadiums".

See also 

 List of NCAA Division I FBS football stadiums

References

External links 

 
 Ballparks.com: Lincoln Financial Field
 ESPN Stadium Guide: Lincoln Financial Field – Philadelphia
 Stadiums of Pro Football: Lincoln Financial Field
 Temple Official Athletic Site Facilities: Lincoln Financial Field – Football

2003 establishments in Pennsylvania
2003 FIFA Women's World Cup stadiums
2026 FIFA World Cup Stadiums
American football venues in Pennsylvania
Army–Navy Game
College lacrosse venues in the United States
CONCACAF Gold Cup stadiums
Lacrosse venues in the United States
National Football League venues
NBBJ buildings
NCAA Men's Division I Lacrosse Championship venues
Philadelphia Eagles stadiums
Soccer venues in Pennsylvania
South Philadelphia
Sports venues completed in 2003
Sports venues in Philadelphia
Temple Owls football venues